Roi Méndez Martínez (born 30 September 1993) is a Spanish singer and guitarist.

Biography
Roi Méndez was born in Santiago de Compostela on 30 September 1993. He got a bachelor's degree in audio technology. He was a member of the Orquesta Olympus, a famous orchestra in Galicia. In 2009 he played in My Camp Rock.

Career

He gained national recognition when he took part in series nine of the reality television music competition Operación Triunfo, where he was the tenth evicted against Ana Guerra. Throughout the contest he performed several songs, but his duet with the winner Amaia Romero, a cover of "Shape of You" by Ed Sheeran, was considered one of the best performances of the contest and was recorded for Romero's album Amaia Romero: Sus canciones.

Once finished the contest, Roi was part of the Spanish Operación Triunfo tour, performing in such notable venues as the Palau Sant Jordi in Barcelona, the Olympic Stadium in La Cartuja in Seville, and the Bizkaia Arena in Bilbao. On 29 June, Roi and the rest of contestants of Operación Triunfo 2017 gave a special charity concert at Santiago Bernabéu Stadium in Madrid, which was attended by 60,000 spectators. He released his first single "Por una vez más" on 15 June 2018. It got more than one millions of views on YouTube. During the Operación Triunfo 2017 tour, Roi performed his debut single "Por una vez más" and "Shape of You" with Amaia Romero. In May 2018 Roi was chosen one of the members of Spanish Eurovision jury during Eurovision Song Contest 2018.

On 10 August 2018 he made a concert in Vigo with his fellow Operación Triunfo 2017 friends Aitana, Ana Guerra, Cepeda and Miriam Rodríguez. Roi was an opening artist with Cepeda and Miriam Rodríguez of the Queen + Adam Lambert's concert in Barcelona on 10 June 2018.

He did a cameo in the second season of the Spanish TV series Paquita Salas (2016). Since September 2018, Roi co-hosts the radio show Vodafone Yu in Los 40, becoming one of the images of the radio station. A study of network influences revealed that Roi was the most engagement instagramer on 2018 due to his skill to create strong relationships with his followers.

On 1 March 2019 he released his second single called "Plumas" and defining it as a modern funky style. The single managed to reach number two on iTunes Spain. On 22 March 2019 Roi released his first full album, Mi lógico desorden. This album entered the Spanish Music Chart with second position and 14 in streaming. The album was during 10 weeks on chart.

He appeared along Ana Guerra in the second episode of 99 lugares donde pasar miedo, aired on 4 May 2019 on Discovery MAX, where they visited the Loch Ness, Comlongon Castle and Greyfriars Kirkyard.

On 22 May 2020 Roi released his third single "Aviones de Papel" with Spanish pop rock band Sinsinati, which became one of the 2020 summer songs of Los 40.

Performances on Operación Triunfo

Personal life
He is a supporter of LGBT rights. He is influenced by Ed Sheeran, Shawn Mendes, Sting, Bruno Mars, Bryan Adams and Michael Jackson.

Discography

Singles

Albums

Filmography

Television

Radio

References

External links

 
 Universal Music Spain website
 Roi Méndez on Spotify
 
 
 
 
 

1993 births
Living people
People from Santiago de Compostela
Singers from Galicia (Spain)
Musicians from Galicia (Spain)
English-language singers from Spain
Spanish LGBT rights activists
Operación Triunfo contestants
21st-century Spanish singers
21st-century Spanish male singers